Tennis was part of the Summer Olympic Games program from the inaugural 1896 Summer Olympics, but was dropped after the 1924 Summer Olympics due to disputes between the International Lawn Tennis Federation and the International Olympic Committee over how to define amateur players. After two appearances as a demonstration sport in 1968 and 1984 (with a U-21 age limit), it returned as a full medal sport at the 1988 Summer Olympics open for all players regardless of their age and status and has been played at every summer Games since then.

In 1896, 1900, 1904, 1988, 1992, semifinal losers shared bronze medals. In all other years, a playoff match for the bronze medal was staged. From the 2004 until the 2012 Summer Olympics, results from the Olympics had ranking points that the ATP and WTA added to their players' annual totals in singles for that calendar year. This was discontinued beginning with the 2016 Summer Olympics. While the number of ranking points did not equate with those given at the majors, the Olympic tournaments have increased in perceived importance since their reintroduction, with some players, critics and sports pundits considering winning gold at the Olympics just as prestigious as winning a major title and some considering it even more prestigious.Serena Williams and Venus Williams have each won a record four gold medals, three each as a doubles pairing, the only players to win the same Olympic event on three occasions. Venus Williams (four gold, one silver) and Kathleen McKane Godfree (one gold, two silvers, and two bronzes) are the all-time record holders for the most Olympic tennis medals, with five each. Andy Murray is the only player to have won two singles gold medals, and the only singles player to have retained the Olympic title. Nicolás Massú, Venus Williams, and Serena Williams are the only players in the Open Era to win both the singles and same-sex doubles tournaments at one Games, doing so in 2004, 2000, and 2012 respectively.A player who wins an Olympic or Paralympic gold medal and all four majors in the same year is said to have won a Golden Slam. As of 2021, Steffi Graf is the only player to done so through the Olympic gold. In 2021, wheelchair tennis players Diede de Groot and Dylan Alcott did so through Paralympic gold. 

Come 2024, in line with all Grand Slam tournaments, the deciding set (third) will have a 10-point tiebreaker game to decide the match at 6-all. Should the tiebreaker game be tied at 9-all, whoever scores two straight points wins it.

Summary

Surface
The playing surface of the court varies between Olympic Games. It has been on hard court for every game since 1984 except for the 1992 Olympics (which was on a clay court) and the 2012 Olympics (which was played on a grass court). The changing playing surface gives certain players different advantages and disadvantages not seen in most other Olympic sports.

Events
(d) = demonstration event, (e) = exhibition event

Champions and venues

Participating nations

Medal tables

All years
Sources:

Open Era

Amateur Era

Multiple medal winners (1896–2020)

See also
 List of Olympic venues in tennis
 Tennis at the Youth Olympic Games
 Tennis at the Mediterranean Games
 Tennis at the Pan American Games
 List of Olympic medalists in tennis
 Wheelchair tennis at the Summer Paralympics

References

External links
 Olympic Tennis Event website (International Tennis Federation)

 
Sports at the Summer Olympics
Olympics